The 2014–15 network television schedule for the four major Brazilian Portuguese commercial broadcast networks in Brazil covers primetime hours from April 2014 to March 2015.

The schedule is followed by a list per network of returning series, new series or telenovelas (soap operas), and series canceled after the 2013–14 season.

Legend

Schedule
 New series are highlighted in bold.
 All times are in Brasília time. Add one hour for Atlantic islands time, subtract one hour for Amazon time and two hours for Acre time.
 Note: From June 12 to July 13, 2014 all Rede Globo primetime programming was pre-empted for coverage of 2014 FIFA World Cup.

 Lime indicates the #1 most watched program of the season.
 Yellow indicates the top-10 most watched programs of the season

Sunday

Monday

Tuesday

Wednesday

Thursday

Friday

Saturday

By network

Band

Returning series:
 Pânico na Band
 CQC
 O Mundo Segundo os Brasileiros
 A Liga
 Agora é Tarde
 Wednesday Football Night
 Polícia 24h

New series:
 MasterChef

Not returning from 2013–14:
 Quem Fica em Pé?
 Quem Quer Casar Com Meu Filho?

Globo

Returning series:
 Domingão do Faustão
 Dança dos Famosos
 Fantástico
 Tela Quente
 Tapas & Beijos
 Pé na Cova
 Profissão Repórter
 Wednesday Football Night
 A Grande Família
 Na Moral
 The Voice Brasil
 Amor & Sexo
 Big Brother Brasil

New series:
 SuperStar
 A Segunda Dama
 Tá no Ar
 O Caçador
 Sexo e as Negas
 Dupla Identidade
 Felizes para Sempre?
 Planeta Extremo
New telenovelas:
 Em Família
 Meu Pedacinho de Chão
 Geração Brasil
 O Rebu
 Império

Not returning from 2013–14:
 O Dentista Mascarado
 A Mulher do Prefeito
 Louco por Elas
 Amores Roubados
 A Teia
 Doce de Mãe

Record

Returning series:
 Domingo Espetacular
 Repórter Record
 Roberto Justus +
 Aprendiz Celebridades
 Câmera Record
 A Fazenda
 Legendários

New series:
 Milagres de Jesus
 Me Leva Contigo
 Plano Alto
 Programa da Sabrina
New telenovelas:
 Vitória

Not returning from 2013–14:
 Got Talent Brasil
 José do Egito
 O Melhor do Brasil

SBT

Returning series:
 Programa Silvio Santos
 Programa do Ratinho
 Máquina da Fama
 Conexão Repórter
  A Praça é Nossa
 Esquadrão da Moda
 Festival Sertanejo
Returning telenovelas:
 Chiquititas
 Rebelde

New series:
 Esse Artista Sou Eu
 The Noite
 Cozinha Sob Pressão
 Patrulha Salvadora
 Arena SBT

Not returning from 2013–14:
 Astros
 SBT Repórter
 Cante Se Puder
 Amigos da Onça
 Famoso Quem?

Renewals and cancellations

Renewals

Globo
 Pé na Cova—Renewed for a fourth season on June 14, 2014.
 SuperStar—Renewed for a second season on June 5, 2014.
 Tá no Ar—Renewed for a second season on June 5, 2014.
 Tapas & Beijos—Renewed for a fifth and final season on August 21, 2014.

Record
 Aprendiz Celebridades—Renewed for eleventh season on July 3, 2014.
 Milagres de Jesus—Renewed for a second season on March 18, 2014.

Cancellations/Series endings

Globo
A Grande Família—It was announced on March 17, 2014 that season fourteen would be the final season. The series concluded on September 11, 2014.

Record
Me Leva Contigo—Canceled on July 22, 2014.

SBT
 Arena SBT—Canceled on July 22, 2014.

References

Television in Brazil
2014 in Brazilian television
2015 in Brazilian television
Brazilian television schedules